Zvyagintsev is a Russian surname. Notable people with the surname include:

Andrey Zvyagintsev (born 1964), Russian film director
Vadim Zvjaginsev (born 1976), Russian chess player
Vasily Zvyagintsev (born 1944), Russian author
Viktor Zvyahintsev (born 1950), Soviet retired footballer

See also
Zvyagin

Russian-language surnames